Saint-Hyacinthe is a provincial electoral riding in the Montérégie region of Quebec, Canada. It notably includes the cities of Saint-Hyacinthe and Saint-Pie.

It was created for the 1867 election (and an electoral district of that name existed earlier in the Legislative Assembly of the Province of Canada and the Legislative Assembly of Lower Canada).

In the change from the 2001 to the 2011 electoral map, it gained La Présentation from Verchères electoral district and Saint-Pie from Iberville electoral district.

Members of the Legislative Assembly / National Assembly

Election results

|}

|}

^ Change is from redistributed results; CAQ change is from ADQ

|-
 
|Liberal
|Claude Corbeil
|align="right"|11,609
|align="right"|37.38
|align="right"|

|-

|}

References

External links
Information
 Elections Quebec

Election results
 Election results (National Assembly)

Maps
 2011 map (PDF)
 2001 map (Flash)
2001–2011 changes (Flash)
1992–2001 changes (Flash)
 Electoral map of Montérégie region
 Quebec electoral map, 2011 

Quebec provincial electoral districts
Saint-Hyacinthe